Chang Wan-chen (born 29 September 1979) is a Taiwanese taekwondo practitioner. 

She won a bronze medal in welterweight at the 1999 World Taekwondo Championships, and a silver medal at the 2001 World Taekwondo Championships. She won a silver medal at the 2002 Asian Games.

References

External links

1979 births
Living people
Taiwanese female taekwondo practitioners
Taekwondo practitioners at the 2002 Asian Games
Asian Games medalists in taekwondo
Medalists at the 2002 Asian Games
Asian Games silver medalists for Chinese Taipei
World Taekwondo Championships medalists
20th-century Taiwanese women
21st-century Taiwanese women